Hillcrest Heights is an unincorporated area and census-designated place (CDP) in Prince George's County, Maryland, United States. The population was 15,793 at the 2020 census. For mailing address purposes, it is part of the smaller community of Temple Hills and is also near Suitland.

Geography
Hillcrest Heights is located at  (38.838212, -76.959795).

Hillcrest Heights borders the adjacent communities of Marlow Heights, Silver Hill, Suitland, and Glassmanor.

Hillcrest Heights consists mainly of single-family rambler homes and duplex homes built in the 1950s and 1960s. Iverson Mall, a midsize two-level shopping mall which opened in 1967, serves shoppers from Maryland communities as well as from the Anacostia section of Washington. Adjacent to the mall is the older Marlow Heights shopping center. Stations of the Metrorail Green Line are nearby. Also nearby are the U.S. Census Bureau in Suitland and, farther out, Joint Base Andrews and the Capital Beltway. The neighborhood is also convenient to Capitol Hill.

Demographics

2020 census

Note: the US Census treats Hispanic/Latino as an ethnic category. This table excludes Latinos from the racial categories and assigns them to a separate category. Hispanics/Latinos can be of any race.

2000 Census
As of the census of 2000, there were 16,359 people, 6,752 households, and 4,206 families residing in the CDP. The racial makeup of the CDP was 4.58% White, 93.18% African American, 0.12% Native American, 0.35% Asian, 0.01% Pacific Islander, 0.32% from other races, and 1.44% from two or more races. Hispanic or Latino of any race were 1.11% of the population.

There were 6,752 households, out of which 28.1% had children under the age of 18 living with them, 29.2% were married couples living together, 27.0% had a female householder with no husband present, and 37.7% were non-families. 32.5% of all households were made up of individuals, and 5.7% had someone living alone who was 65 years of age or older. The average household size was 2.42 and the average family size was 3.06.

In the CDP, the population was spread out, with 25.4% under the age of 18, 8.7% from 18 to 24, 30.3% from 25 to 44, 26.1% from 45 to 64, and 9.5% who were 65 years of age or older. The median age was 36 years. For every 100 females, there were 83.2 males. For every 100 females age 18 and over, there were 75.4 males.

The median income for a household in the CDP was $46,367, and the median income for a family was $52,573. Males had a median income of $34,198 versus $34,558 for females. The per capita income for the CDP was $22,620. About 6.7% of families and 7.4% of the population were below the poverty line, including 9.0% of those under age 18 and 11.5% of those age 65 or over.

History
Much of the community was originally an estate, Colebrook, purchased in 1671 by Thomas Dent and William Hatton, and then in 1688 by Colonel John Addison.  Colebrook Manor, the family homestead of the Addisons, was built in 1808, located in Oxon Run Valley, 2/5 of a mile southeast of the Washington, D.C. line.

Government
Prince George's County Police Department District 4 Station in Glassmanor CDP, with an Oxon Hill postal address, serves the community.

The United States Postal Service operates the Anacostia Carrier Annex in the Hillcrest Heights CDP, with a Temple Hills postal address.

Education
The CDP is served by the Prince George's County Public Schools district.

Sections are served by Hillcrest Heights and Panorama elementary schools. All residents are zoned to Benjamin Stoddert Middle School. Most areas are zoned to Potomac High School with some zoned to Crossland High School. There is also a special education school, Jessie B. Mason Regional School, formerly Hillcrest Heights Special Center.

G. Gardner Shugart Middle School was previously in Hillcrest Heights. Shugart was scheduled to close in 2009. According to a Washington Post article written by Nelson Hernandez, Shugart, in which 35% of its students passed a State of Maryland mathematics proficiency test and which underwent a restructuring required by State of Maryland authorities, "is among the schools with long-standing academic problems".

Holy Family Catholic School, a Catholic pre-K to Grade 8 school, is in Hillcrest Heights. The school, on an  campus, opened in 1957. The school closed at the end of the 2019–2020 school year.

External links
 Marlow Heights 60s and 70s

References

Census-designated places in Prince George's County, Maryland
Census-designated places in Maryland
Washington metropolitan area